Kyle Baseball Field was a baseball venue located in College Station, TX and was approximate to the football stadium, Kyle Field. The ballpark was installed at the same time as the football stadium in 1904; Texas A&M were one of the original members of the Southwest Conference in 1914 but did not begin baseball until 1915.

Field conditions
As compared to the more modern Olsen Field, Kyle Baseball Field gave birth to rocks because it was constructed on an ancient parking lot, and the rocks came up through the surface. Each day preceding practice, the team had to line up across the field and went from one end to the other, removing the rocks so the infielders wouldn't get injured in the face from bad hops.

Field contraction
The ballpark had a grandstand finished in June 1923 which cost $7,500 at the time. With expansion to Kyle Field in 1929, 1954, and 1969, the baseball field, in contrast, kept shrinking. Due to the small capacity of the baseball field, the Aggies had to play the 1959 District 6 playoffs with the University of Arizona at Travis Field in nearby Bryan; the Aggies lost the two games in the double-elimination by identical 1–0 in front of 6,000. From 1972 to 1975, Texas A&M had to make Travis Field their home away from "home" because the school representatives took Kyle Baseball Field from the baseball team during another series of augmentation of Kyle Field. The Texas A&M Aggies played their last seasons at Kyle Baseball Field in 1976 and 1977. With the opening of UFCU Disch-Falk Field in Austin in 1975, the Aggies knew they had to construct a new facility in order to compete with their in-state rivals which led to Olsen Field in 1978.

Legacy
The Aggies won Southwest Conference titles in 1931, 1934, 1942, 1951 (co-champions with UT-Austin), 1955, 1959, and 1977 while calling Kyle Baseball Field their home.

Sources
 "Southwest Conference's Greatest Hits," Neal Farmer, c.1996

References

Baseball venues in Texas
Defunct college baseball venues in the United States
Texas A&M Aggies baseball venues
1904 establishments in Texas
Sports venues completed in 1904
Sports venues in College Station, Texas